Pamukkale University Arena is an indoor multi-purpose sport venue that is located in the Pamukkale University, Denizli, Turkey. Opened in 2014, the hall has a seating capacity of 5,000 spectators. It was home for Denizli Basket formerly. Currently it is home for Merkezefendi Belediyesi Denizli Basket, which plays currently in the BSL.

Gallery

References

Sports venues completed in 2014
Indoor arenas in Turkey
Basketball venues in Turkey
2014 establishments in Turkey
Denizli